Odukoya is Yoruba surname. Notable people with the surname include:
 Abiodun Odukoya, Nigerian-German singer
 Bimbo Odukoya, Nigerian pastor and tele evangelist
 Taiwo Odukoya, Nigerian pastor

Yoruba-language surnames